Power Trip: A Decade of Policy, Plots and Spin is a memoir by  Damian McBride, former special advisor to Gordon Brown, between 1999 and 2009.

References

Books about politics of the United Kingdom
2013 non-fiction books
2013 in British politics
British memoirs
Political memoirs
Biteback Publishing books